Salopella is a form genus for small fossil plants of Late Silurian to Early Devonian age. The diagnostic characters are naked axes branching isotomously, terminating in fusiform sporangia. The sporangia are unbranched, but in at least the type species the axes seem to branch just under the sporangia. It differs from the similar form genus Tortilicaulis in that the sporangia do not have spirally arranged cells, and from other similar form genera such as Cooksonia, Uskiella and Tarrantia in the shape of the sporangia.

Species have been reported from Wales, Xinjiang, Brazil and Australia. Most species are based on very small fragments of the tips of plants, the exceptions being the two Australian species which preserve rather more of the plant. The relationships of the genus are not clear because many anatomical details remain unknown. A useful summary table of what data is known was given by Edwards et al. It has been considered to be a member of the rhyniophytes.

References

Silurian plants
Early Devonian plants
Prehistoric plant genera
Silurian first appearances
Early Devonian genus extinctions